The South Carolina High School League (SCHSL) is an organization that regulates high school sports in South Carolina. Each year since 1916, the SCHSL has crowned a state champion in football. Every fall, a postseason consisting of a 16 school bracket is played to determine a winner. 

The divisions for football are based on school enrollment. Divisions include:
 AAAAA (quin-A or 5A)
 AAAA (quad-A or 4A)
 AAA (triple-A or 3A)
 AA (double-A or 2A)
 A (one-A or 1A)
The SCHSL historically had a B and C division but these divisions are no longer used.

Champions
Source

AAAAA

AAAA

AAAA Division I (1981-2015)

AAAA Division II (1981-2015)

AAA

AA

AA Division I (1990-1991,2011-2015)

AA Division II (1990-1991,2011-2015)

A

A Division I (1991,2006-2015)

A Division II (1991,2006-2015)

B

C

Pre 1932

Most State Championships

References 

South Carolina
South Carolina-related lists
Sports in South Carolina
High school sports in South Carolina
American football in South Carolina
High school football in South Carolina
High school sports in the United States by state
High school football in the United States by state